Thomas H. Bagley was an English professional footballer who played as an outside right.

Career
Born in Birkenhead, Bagley played for Bury, Bradford City and Stockport County. For Bradford City, he made 31 appearances in the Football League; he also made 6 appearances in the FA Cup.

Sources

References

20th-century births
Year of death missing
English footballers
Bury F.C. players
Bradford City A.F.C. players
Stockport County F.C. players
English Football League players
Association football outside forwards
People from Birkenhead